This is the list of governors of South Tyrol since 1948. The German title of the governor is Landeshauptmann.

{| class="wikitable"
|-
!colspan=8|Governors of South Tyrol
|-
!width=150 colspan=2 align="left" |Governor
!Portrait
!width=45 align="center"|Party
!colspan=2 width=200 align="left"|Term
!width=105 align="left"|Legislature
!width=45|Election
|-
|rowspan=2 bgcolor="black" |
|rowspan=2 style="text-align:center;" |Karl Erckert
|rowspan=2|
|rowspan=2 align="center"|SVP
|13 December 1948
|12 December 1952
|I Legislature
|1948
|-
|13 December 1952
|15 December 1955†
|rowspan=2|II Legislature
|rowspan=2|1952
|-
|rowspan=2 bgcolor="black" |
|rowspan=2 style="text-align:center;" |Alois Pupp
|rowspan=2|
|rowspan=2 align="center"|SVP
|7 January 1956
|12 December 1956
|-
|13 December 1956
|12 December 1960
|III Legislature
|1956
|-
| rowspan=7 bgcolor="black" |
| rowspan=7 style="text-align:center;" |Silvius Magnago
| rowspan=7|
| rowspan=7 align="center"|SVP
|13 December 1960
|13 December 1964
|IV Legislature
|1960
|-
|14 December 1964
|12 December 1968
|V Legislature
|1964
|-
|13 December 1968
|12 December 1973
|VI Legislature
|1968
|-
|13 December 1973
|12 December 1978
|VII Legislature
|1973
|-
|13 December 1978
|12 December 1983
|VIII Legislature
|1978
|-
|13 December 1983
|12 December 1988
|IX Legislature
|1983
|-
|13 December 1988
|17 March 1989
|rowspan=2|X Legislature
|rowspan=2|1988
|-
|rowspan=6 bgcolor="black" |
|rowspan=6 style="text-align:center;" |Luis Durnwalder
|rowspan=6|
|rowspan=6 align="center"|SVP
|17 March 1989
|12 December 1993
|-
|13 December 1993
|16 December 1998
|XI Legislature
|1993
|-
|17 December 1998
|20 November 2003
|XII Legislature
|1998
|-
|21 November 2003
|2 December 2008
|XIII Legislature
|2003
|-
|3 December 2008
|27 November 2013
|XIV Legislature
|2008
|-
|28 November 2013
|7 January 2014
|rowspan=2|XV Legislature
|rowspan=2|2013
|-
|rowspan=2 bgcolor="black" |
|rowspan=2 style="text-align:center;" |Arno Kompatscher
|rowspan=2|
|rowspan=2 align="center"|SVP
|7 January 2014
|20 November 2018
|-
|21 November 2018
|Incumbent
|XVI Legislature
|2018
|}

References 

 
South Tyrol